Dr. Oakley, Yukon Vet is an American television series on Nat Geo Wild. The show premiered 4 April 2014. The show stars Dr. Michelle Oakley and follows her adventures usually around her home base of Haines Junction, Yukon and Haines, Alaska. Dr. Oakley  attended the Atlantic Veterinary College in Prince Edward Island, Canada and interned at the Calgary Zoo.

Cast

Veterinarian 
Dr. Michelle Oakley D.V.M.

Family 
 Shane Oakley, Husband
 Sierra Oakley, Daughter and vet assistant
 Maya Oakley, Daughter and vet assistant 
 Willow Oakley, Daughter

Narrator 
 Zac Fine
 Dr. Michelle Oakley

Episodes

Season 1 (2014)

Season 2 (2015)

Season 3 (2016)

Season 4 (2016)

Season 5 (2017)

Season 6 (2018)

Season 7 (2019)

Season 8 (2020)

Season 9 (2021)

Season 10 (2021)

References

External links

National Geographic (American TV channel) original programming
Nature educational television series
2014 American television series debuts
English-language television shows